= Querent =

Querent may refer to:

- The person who consults a divination process
- Plaintiff, the person initiating a lawsuit
